Jonas Bengt Svensson (born 21 October 1966) is a former professional tennis player from Sweden.

During his career, Svensson was a French Open semi-finalist twice (in 1988 and 1990) both times as unseeded player. 
In the 1988 French Open he defeated Ivan Lendl in the quarters and lost to Henri Leconte in the semis. 
In the 1990 French Open he defeated Sergi Bruguera in 5 sets in the 2nd round, who had earlier defeated Stefan Edberg, the top seed  in the 1st round. He lost to Andre Agassi in the semis. In the 1989 Australian Open he defeated Boris Becker in the 4th round.

He won five top-level singles titles and reached a career-high singles ranking of world No. 10.

He later married Swedish hurdler Frida Svensson.

Career finals

Singles: 14 (5 wins, 9 losses)

{|
|-valign=top
|

Singles performance timeline

References

External links 
 
 
 

Swedish male tennis players
Sportspeople from Gothenburg
1966 births
Living people